North County refers to the northern part of San Diego County, the most populous region with this name.

It may also refer to:

Places
North County, another name for Massachusetts' Montachusett Region, located in the northern Worcester County
North County, the northwestern corner of Alameda County, California containing the cities of Oakland and Berkeley
North County, a name for the north part of St. Louis County, Missouri used by residents of the Greater St. Louis area of Missouri and Illinois
North County, the northern part of Prince George's County, Maryland (part of the D.C. metro area)
North County Dublin, an area north of Dublin, Ireland (now part of Fingal county)
North Dublin (UK Parliament constituency), an historic UK Parliament constituency representing the area (1885–1922)
Dublin County North (Dáil constituency), an historic Irish Dáil Éireann constituency representing the area (1969–1981)
North County, Jefferson Territory, an historic county (1859-1861) in the extralegal U.S. territory of Jefferson (present-day Colorado)

Media
 North County Times, formerly the primary newspaper of northern San Diego County, sold in 2012